Buckingham Field  is a private-use airport located seven nautical miles (13 km) east of the central business district of Fort Myers, in Lee County, Florida, United States. It is privately owned by the Lee County Mosquito Control District. The Buckingham Air Park has deeded access to the airport.

Facilities
Buckingham Field has two concrete paved runways: 14/32 measuring 4,046 x 400 ft (1,233 x 122 m) and 6/24 measuring 2,726 x 400 ft (831 x 122 m).

History
Originally constructed for the United States Army Air Corps as Buckingham Field, the airfield had its origins as an aircraft gunner training base to train the aerial gunners who would defend bombers. The airfield originally had three 5,000-foot runways, with two oval tracks of the Ground Moving Target Range, located to the west of the airfield, as well as nearby skeet ranges and trap ranges.

After the war, the barracks at Buckingham were briefly used as the Edison College, but this closed in 1948. Most of the buildings of the original base were subsequently removed over time.

A street grid for a planned housing development named Lehigh Acres was eventually built over the area formerly occupied by Buckingham's runways in the 1950s. By the mid-1970s, the runways were gone except for the concrete ends. The 1978 Miami Sectional Chart depicted three paved portions of Buckingham's former ramp as the runways of the Lehigh Acres West private airfield. The longest runway was depicted as 3,000'.

The street grid built over the location of the former runways remained undeveloped for some period of time, before eventually being partially filled in with houses, it remains, however, about 90% unoccupied.

By 2000, the northern portion of the ramp was used as a runway, being operated as a private field, Buckingham Field Airport, by the Lee County Mosquito/Hyacinth Control District, which operates a fleet of 23 aircraft and helicopters (including C-47s and several rare C-117 Super Dakotas).

Portions of the ramp area are also used for automobile racing.

References

External links
 

1942 establishments in Florida
Airports in Florida
Transportation buildings and structures in Lee County, Florida
Airports established in 1942
Privately owned airports